The 1975–76 DFB-Pokal was the 33rd season of the annual German football cup competition. It began on 1 August 1975 and ended on 26 June 1976. 128 teams competed in the tournament of seven rounds. In the final Hamburger SV defeated 1. FC Kaiserslautern 2–0.

Matches

First round

Replays

Second round

Third round

Replays

Round of 16

Replay

Quarter-finals

Replay

Semi-finals

Replay

Final

References

External links
 Official site of the DFB 
 Kicker.de 
 1975–76 results at Fussballdaten.de 
 1975–76 results at Weltfussball.de 

1975-76
1975–76 in German football cups